Asahikawa Air Field  is a military aerodrome of the Japan Ground Self-Defense Force.

References

Airports in Japan
Japan Ground Self-Defense Force bases